The following outline is provided as an overview of and topical guide to Wikipedia articles on the life and influence of Jesus.

Jesus – central figure of Christianity, whom the teachings of most Christian denominations hold to be the Son of God. Christianity regards Jesus as the awaited Messiah (or "Christ") of the Old Testament and refers to him as Jesus Christ, a name that is also used in non-Christian contexts. Also referred to as Jesus of Nazareth. He is a religious, cultural, worldwide icon, and is among the most influential people in human history.

Essence of Jesus 

As a topic, "Jesus" falls under the following parent topics:
 Religion
 Theism – belief that one or more gods exist
 Monotheism – belief that only one God exists
 Abrahamic Religions – religions claiming Abraham as a direct forebear or prophet 
 Christianity – monotheistic religion claiming Jesus as its founder
 Christology
 Adoptionism
 Monophysitism
 Dyophysitism
 Docetism

Views of Jesus

Traditional Christian view of Jesus 

 Christian views of Jesus
 Jesus in the Christian Bible 
 New Testament view on Jesus' life
 Gospel
 Gospel harmony
 Miracles attributed to Jesus
 Names and titles of Jesus in the New Testament
 Sexuality of Jesus
 Son of God
 Son of Man
 Virgin birth of Jesus

Four traditional Gospels 

The word "gospel" is translated from a Greek word meaning "good news."

 Gospel of Matthew –
 Gospel of Mark –
 Gospel of Luke –
 Gospel of John –

Trinity 

 Trinity
God in Christianity
 Nontrinitarianism
God in Mormonism
Islamic view of the Trinity

Non-canonical Gospels 
 Egerton Gospel
 Fayyum Fragment
 Gospel of James
 Gospel of Peter
 Gospel of Thomas
 Infancy Gospel of Thomas
 Oxyrhynchus Gospels
 Syriac Infancy Gospel

Additional Gospels 
Book of Mormon
Doctrine and Covenants
The Desire of Ages
The Urantia Book
The Aquarian Gospel of Jesus the Christ

Historical view of Jesus 

 Historical Jesus
 Historicity of Jesus
 Cultural and historical background of Jesus

Islamic view of Jesus 

 Jesus in Islam
 Virgin birth of Jesus
 Jesus in Ahmadiyya Islam

Judaic view of Jesus 

 Judaism's view of Jesus
 Jesus in the Talmud
 apostate

Other views of Jesus 

 Manifestation of God (Baháʼí Faith)
 Mandeanism – do not believe in Jesus as Messiah
 Manicheanism – accepted Jesus as a prophet, along with Gautama Buddha and Zoroaster
 Jesusism –

View of Jesus as myth 

 Jesus myth theory

Events in Jesus' life 

 Chronology of Jesus

Events in Jesus' life from the traditional Gospels 

 Annunciation
 Nativity of Jesus
 Circumcision of Jesus
 Christ child
 Baptism of Jesus
 Temptation of Christ
 Ministry of Jesus
 Commissioning the twelve apostles
 Sermon on the Mount
 Rejection of Jesus
 Transfiguration of Jesus
 Giving the great commandment
 Palm Sunday
 Cursing the fig tree
 Cleansing of the Temple
 Second Coming
 Anointing of Jesus
 Last supper
 Promising a Paraclete
 The passion
 The Passion of the Christ
 Arrest of Jesus
 Sanhedrin Trial of Jesus
 Pilate's court
 Flagellation of Christ
 Crown of thorns
 Crucifixion of Jesus
 Entombment of Christ
 Resurrection of Jesus
 Empty tomb
 Resurrection appearances of Jesus
 Great Commission
 Ascension of Jesus

Miracles 

Miracles of Jesus

Cures 
 Healing the mother of Peter's wife
 Healing the deaf mute of Decapolis
 Healing the man blind from birth
 Healing the paralytic at Bethesda
 Blind man of Bethsaida
 Healing the blind near Jericho
 Healing the centurion's servant
 Jesus healing an infirm woman
 Healing the man with a withered hand
 Jesus cleansing a leper
 Cleansing ten lepers
 Healing a man with dropsy
 Jesus healing the bleeding woman
 Healing the paralytic at Capernaum
 Jesus healing in the land of Gennesaret
 Healing the two blind men in Galilee

Power over demonic spirits 

 Exorcising a boy possessed by a demon
 Exorcism of the Syrophoenician woman's daughter
 Exorcism of the Gerasene demoniac
 Jesus in the synagogue of Capernaum
 Jesus exorcising at sunset
 Exorcising the blind and mute man
 Jesus exorcising a mute

Resurrection of the dead 

 Raising of the son of the widow of Nain
 Raising of Jairus' daughter
 Raising of Lazarus

Control over nature 

 Marriage at Cana
 Jesus walking on water
 Calming the storm
 Transfiguration of Jesus
 Feeding the multitude
 Miraculous catch of fish
 Cursing the fig tree
 Coin in the fish's mouth

Teachings of Jesus

Parables of Jesus 
 Parables of Jesus

Canonical parables 
 Barren Fig Tree
 Budding Fig Tree
 Counting the cost
 Drawing in the Net
 Faithful Servant
 Friend at Night
 Good Samaritan
 Great Banquet
 Growing Seed
 Hidden Treasure
 Lamp
 Leaven 
 Lost Coin
 Lost Sheep
 Master and Servant
 Mustard Seed
 New Wine into Old Wineskins
 Pearl
 Pharisee and the Publican
 Prodigal Son
 Rich Fool
 Rich man and Lazarus
 Sower
 Strong Man
 Talents
 Tares
 Ten Virgins
 Two Debtors
 Two Sons
 Unjust Judge
 Unjust Steward
 Unforgiving Servant
 Wicked Husbandmen
 Wise and Foolish Builders
 Workers in the Vineyard

Non-canonical parables 
 Assassin
 Empty Jar

Genealogy of Jesus 
Genealogy of Jesus

Influence of Jesus 

 Ministry of Jesus
 Parables of Jesus

Religious practices related to Jesus

Devotions 

 Roman Catholic devotions to Jesus Christ
 Acts of Reparation to Jesus Christ
 Divine Mercy
 Eucharistic adoration
 Holy Face of Jesus
 The Golden Arrow Holy Face Devotion (Prayer)
 Holy Hour
 Holy Name of Jesus
 Holy Wounds
 Rosary of Holy Wounds
 Infant Jesus of Prague
 Precious Blood
 Sacred Heart
 Stations of the Cross

Prayers 

 Jesus Prayer
 Roman Catholic prayers to Jesus
 Anima Christi
 Prayer to the shoulder wound of Jesus
 Morning offering
 Prayer of Consecration to the Sacred Heart
 Act of Consecration to the Sacred Heart of Jesus
 You are Christ
 Saint John Vianney's prayer to Jesus
 Prayer of St. John Gabriel Perboyre to Jesus
 Saint Louis de Montfort's Prayer to Jesus
 Prayer before a Crucifix

Second Coming 

 Second Coming
 Predictions and claims for the Second Coming of Christ
 Christian eschatology
 Katechon
 Second Coming in Mormonism
 Seventh-day Adventist eschatology

Relics 

 Holy Prepuce
 Shroud of Turin
 Holy Grail

Media featuring Jesus

Dramatic portrayals of Jesus Christ 
Dramatic portrayals of Jesus Christ where Jesus is the primary character

Films about Jesus
:Category:Films about Jesus
The Gospel of John (2003 film)
The Gospel of John (2014 film)
 The Gospel According to St. Matthew
 The Passion of Christ
 Jesus (1999 film)
 Son of God (film)
:Category:Films about the Nativity of Jesus
 Joseph & Mary
 The Nativity Story

Plays about Jesus
Oberammergau Passion Play

Musicals about Jesus
 Jesus Christ Superstar
 Godspell

Novels about Jesus
Christ the Lord: Out of Egypt
King Jesus

Series about Jesus
The Chosen (TV series)

Dramatic portrayals containing Jesus Christ 
Dramatic portrayals of Jesus Christ that contain Jesus as a secondary character

Films containing Jesus
Ben-Hur
Monty Python's Life of Brian

Plays containing Jesus

Musicals containing Jesus

Novels containing Jesus

Non-fiction books about Jesus 

List of books about Jesus
 Beautiful Outlaw
 The Book of Nestor the Priest
 Caesar's Messiah
 The Christ Myth
 Christian Beginnings
 The Desire of Ages
 Did Jesus Exist? (Ehrman)
 Jesus before Christianity
 The Jesus Dynasty
 The Jesus Family Tomb
 The Jesus I Never Knew
 Jesus in India (book)
 Jesus of Nazareth: From the Baptism in the Jordan to the Transfiguration
 Jesus of Nazareth: Holy Week
 Jesus of Nazareth: The Infancy Narratives
 The Jesus Scroll
 Jesus the Christ (book)
 Jesus the Jew
 Jesus the Magician
 Jesus the Man
 Jesus, Interrupted
 Jesus: A Portrait
 Jesus: Apocalyptic Prophet of the New Millennium
 Killing Jesus
 Kosher Jesus
 Life of Jesus (Hegel)
 The Life of Our Lord
 The Logia of Yeshua
 The Lord (book)
 Man of Nazareth
 The Myth of God Incarnate
 The Pagan Christ
 The Passover Plot
 The Quest of the Historical Jesus
 The Shroud Conspiracy
 The Spirit of the Liturgy
 The Tomb of God
 Zealot: The Life and Times of Jesus of Nazareth

Related religions

Before Jesus 
 Outline of Judaism
 Zoroastrianism

After Jesus 
 Neoplatonism and Christianity
 Outline of the Catholic Church
 Outline of Protestantism
 Outline of The Church of Jesus Christ of Latter-day Saints

See also 

 Outline of religion
 Outline of Christianity
 Outline of Bible-related topics
 Historical background of New Testament

Images of Jesus
Jesus and John the Baptist
Jesus Movement
Jesus of Nazareth
Jesus-Only doctrine
Visions of Jesus and Mary

Notes

References

External links 

 Complete Sayings of Jesus Christ in parallel Latin and English.
 

Jesus
Jesus
Jesus